Wallsend is a former unincorporated community and current neighborhood of the city of Pineville, located in Bell County, Kentucky, United States.

References

Unincorporated communities in Bell County, Kentucky
Unincorporated communities in Kentucky
Coal towns in Kentucky